Temnora swynnertoni is a moth of the family Sphingidae. It is found in eastern Zimbabwe.

The wingspan is 34–37 mm. It is similar to Temnora plagiata fuscata but the forewing outer margin is only slightly crenulated. The forewing upperside is also similar to Temnora plagiata fuscata but has a triangular brown costa patch which is narrower and the outer margin has a dark brown lunate marginal patch that is basally bordered with a narrow diffuse white line.

References

Temnora
Moths described in 1938
Moths of Sub-Saharan Africa
Lepidoptera of Zimbabwe
Endemic fauna of Zimbabwe